College Ward is an unincorporated community in Cache County, Utah, United States.

The community is located in the southern Cache Valley along U.S. routes 89/91, approximately midway between Wellsville and Logan, the county seat. The city of Nibley borders College Ward to the east.

History
This area was part of a tract of more than  that Brigham Young donated in 1877 for the endowment of Brigham Young College. The first settlers leased plots of land and moved here in 1879.

Demographics

See also

References

External links
1968 Masters Thesis from Utah State University, THE HISTORY OF COLLEGE AND YOUNG WARDS, CACHE COUNTY, UTAH by John A. Hansen

Unincorporated communities in Cache County, Utah
Unincorporated communities in Utah